Gov. Benjamin T. Biggs Farm is a historic home and farm located near Middletown, New Castle County, Delaware.

Buildings 
It was built in 1846, and is a -story, five bay "L"-shaped brick dwelling with a gable roof in a vernacular Greek Revival style. It has a -story gable roofed brick wing. Also on the property are a smokehouse, former implement shed attached to a barn, implement shed, a tall and narrow cupola topped building, and an implement shed with attached dairy.  Also on the property are the remains of a formal garden, including a large rock parenthesized by remnants of two semi-circular lines of boxwoods.

It was the home of Governor Benjamin T. Biggs (1821–1893), who served as U.S. Representative and 46th Governor of Delaware.

Registry 
It was listed on the National Register of Historic Places in 1987.

References

External links

Houses on the National Register of Historic Places in Delaware
Farms on the National Register of Historic Places in Delaware
Greek Revival houses in Delaware
Houses completed in 1846
Houses in New Castle County, Delaware
Historic American Buildings Survey in Delaware
National Register of Historic Places in New Castle County, Delaware